Norman McCabe (February 10, 1911 – January 17, 2006) was an English-born American animator who enjoyed a long career that lasted into the 1990s.

Early career
McCabe was born in England and raised in the United States. He soon developed a career in Tacoma, Washington as a theater lobby artist. During the Great Depression, he moved to Los Angeles to look for more work at lobbies, but to no avail.  In the 1930s, he joined Leon Schlesinger Productions (which produced cartoons for Warner Bros.) as a animator in Frank Tashlin's unit. He moved over to Bob Clampett's unit in 1938 where he animated and/or co-directed several classic black and white Looney Tunes. When Tex Avery left Schlesinger in 1941, Clampett took over Avery's unit and McCabe took over Clampett's old unit. In 1943, McCabe was drafted into the Army and was assigned to the Army Air Corps Training Film Unit (Tashlin took over McCabe's unit after McCabe's final cartoon). In his final Warner cartoon before he left (a black and white World War II-era cartoon called Tokio Jokio), he was billed as "Cpl. Norman McCabe."

He served in the First Motion Picture Unit, headquartered at the Hal Roach Studios. His commanding officer was major Rudolf Ising.

Post-World War II
After the war, McCabe worked on commercial illustrations for such works as the Bozo the Clown children's storybook records and educational films.

He returned to animation in 1963, joining DePatie-Freleng, where he worked on the titles for the feature film The Pink Panther. McCabe animated at DePatie-Freleng, working on Pink Panther cartoons as well as Warner Bros. cartoons. He also directed made for TV cartoons at DePatie-Freleng. During that time, he was usually credited as "Norm McCabe".

McCabe moved to the Filmation animation studio in 1967 working on several Saturday-morning cartoon series. He returned to theatrical animation with the adult animated feature film Fritz the Cat in 1972 before returning to DePatie-Freleng where he animated until the end of the 1970s. An in-joke at the studio had the name of a villain in The Houndcats as being "McCabe".

In the 1980s, McCabe returned to Warner Bros. where he worked on new animation for Warner cartoon feature film anthologies. He also trained a new generation of animators in working with the classic Warner cartoon characters. His last job was as a sheet timer on the series Tazmania and Animaniacs.

Death
McCabe died in January 2006, at age 94, the last surviving director from the golden age of Warner Bros. Cartoons to pass away.

Legacy

McCabe's work is obscure today, because he never made color cartoons during his (relatively brief) directorial tenure at the Schlesinger studio, and several of his cartoons would now be considered offensive due to heavy racial stereotyping (particularly true in his World War II-based cartoons, such as The Ducktators, Confusions of a Nutzy Spy, and Tokio Jokio). During a screening of his cartoons at ASIFA-Hollywood, he spoke highly of Clampett, but was outright embarrassed by his old black-and-white cartoons .  However, he won recognition and accolades from those in the animation business.

Sources

References

External links 
 Lambiek Comiclopedia article.
 Norman McCabe tribute
 

1911 births
2006 deaths
Artists from Newcastle upon Tyne
English animators
United States Army personnel of World War II
British animated film directors
American animated film directors
British emigrants to the United States
First Motion Picture Unit personnel
United States Army Air Forces soldiers
Warner Bros. Cartoons directors
Filmation people